Manna Aviation is an Australian aircraft manufacturer based in Toronto, New South Wales, founded by Phil Hale. The company specializes in provision of parts and plans for amateur construction.

The company focuses on plans for wooden aircraft, with the aim of preserving older aircraft designs.

History

Manna Aviation was established in February 2012, initially as service intended to match available hangar space with aircraft owners seeking hangars. That business proved to be not profitable and the company expanded into aircraft parts, specifically for the Oceania market, including Australia.

The first product sold was an oxy-acetylene welding torch intended for use in welding 4130 steel tubing. This led to the founding of a new company, Cobra Torches Australia.

The company next became a dealer for Flybox Avionics of Italy in Australia and New Zealand, selling electronic flight instrument systems, engine-indicating and crew-alerting systems, instruments and an autopilot system. These lines were spun off to a new company, Cobra Aviation, leaving Manna Aviation to concentrate on the provision of aircraft plans and kits.

Manna Aviation acquired the rights to many of Falconar Avia's designs after that company's founder, Chris Falconar died on 9 September 2018 and that company was wound-up on 30 June 2019. Manna Aviation acquired the rights to the Falconar F9A, Falconar F10A, Falconar F11 Sporty, Falconar F12A Cruiser, Falconar Minihawk, Falconar SAL Mustang, Falconar AMF-14H Maranda and the Falconar AMF-S14 Super Maranda aircraft plans. The company intends to offers kits for the designs in time, as well as  builder-assistance programs.

The company also offers plans for Marcel Jurca's Jurca Sirocco and Druine Turbi designs.

Aircraft 
Summary of Manna Aviation aircraft:
Druine Turbi
Falconar F9A
Falconar F10A
Falconar F11 Sporty
Falconar F12A Cruiser
Falconar Minihawk
Falconar SAL Mustang
Falconar AMF-14H Maranda
Falconar AMF-S14 Super Maranda
Jurca Sirocco

References

External links

Aircraft manufacturers of Australia
Homebuilt aircraft
Manufacturing companies established in 2012
2012 establishments in Australia